Carr is a given name. Notable people with the name include:

Carr Clifton  (born 1957), American photographer
Carr Collins Sr. (1892–1980), American insurance magnate and philanthropist
Carr Neel (1873–1949), American tennis player
Carr Waller Pritchett Sr. (1823–1910), American educator and astronomer
Carr Smith (1901–1989), American baseball player
Carr Van Anda (1864–1945), American editor
Carr B. White (1823–1871) American general

See also
Carr (surname)